The 2004 Antenna Awards ceremony honoured the best in Australian community television in 2003, and took place on February 28, 2004, at Storey Hall, RMIT City Campus, Melbourne, beginning at 7:00 p.m. AEST. The ceremony, the first of its kind in Australia, was announced on December 29, 2003. Produced by Kristy Fuller and directed by Craig Young, the ceremony was hosted by Esther Makris and Gary Mitchell.

Antennas were presented in 31 categories. Radio Karate won four awards, including Best Comedy Program and Best Editing, the most for the evening. Other winners include Dawn's Creek and Pluck with two awards, including Program of the Year for Pluck.

The ceremony was televised live by Channel 31 Melbourne, Channel 31 Sydney, Briz 31 Brisbane, C31 Adelaide, and LINC TV Lismore, and on a one-week delay to Access 31 Perth. On 19 March 2015, the ceremony was made available to stream on YouTube.

Awards
Winners are listed first and highlighted in boldface.

Programs with multiple nominations and awards

Presenters and performers 
The following individuals presented awards or performed musical numbers.

Presenters

Performers

See also
 Logie Awards of 2004
 2004 Australian Film Institute Awards
 2004 ASTRA Awards

Notes

References

 01
Antenna Awards 2004
Antenna Awards 2004
Antenna Awards 2004
Antenna Awards 2004